The following is a list of county routes in Middlesex County in the U.S. state of New Jersey.  For more information on the county route system in New Jersey as a whole, including its history, see County routes in New Jersey.

500-series county routes
In addition to those listed below, the following 500-series county routes serve Middlesex County:
CR 501, CR 514, CR 516, CR 520, CR 522, CR 527, CR 529, CR 531, CR 535, CR 539

Other county routes

See also

References

 
Middlesex